Kevin Allen Jr. (born May 14, 1972) is a former gridiron football defensive back for the Calgary Stampeders of the Canadian Football League. He played four games with the Stampeders in 1995, recording five tackles. He also played arena football for the New Jersey Red Dogs and the Iowa Barnstormers of the Arena Football League. Allen attended Virginia State University, where he played college football for the Virginia State Trojans.

References

1972 births
Living people
American football defensive backs
Canadian football defensive backs
Virginia State Trojans football players
Calgary Stampeders players
New Jersey Red Dogs players
Iowa Barnstormers players
Players of Canadian football from Virginia
Players of American football from Virginia